Kayser is a Swedish thrash metal band from Helsingborg.  They are currently signed to Listenable Records.

Discography

Studio albums
 Kaiserhof (2005)
 1919
 Lost Cause
 Good Citizen
 Noble Is Your Blood
 7 Days to Sink
 Link a Drunk Christ
 Cemented Lies
 The Waltz
 Rafflesia
 Perfect

 Frame the World… Hang it on the Wall (2006)
 The Cake
 Lost in the Mud
 Evolution
 Not Dead… Yet
 Absence
 Turn to Grey
 Cheap Glue
 A Note from Your Wicked Son
 Everlasting
 Fall
 Born Into This
 Jake

 Read your Enemy (2014)
 Bark and Bow
 Bring Out the Clown
 I'll Deny You
 Dreams Bend Clockwise
 Read Your Enemy
 Almost Home
 Where I Belong
 He Knows Your Secrets
 Forever in Doubts
 Carve the Stone
 Roll the Dice
 The Fake Rose

EPs
 The Good Citizen EP (2006)
 Good Citizen
 Lost in the Mud
 Fall
 Propaganda (Non-Album Track)
 Good Citizen (Video)

Members

Current members

 Spice – vocals
 Swaney – guitar
 Jokke - guitar
 Biff - bass
 Bob Ruben - drums

Former members

 Fredrik Finnander - guitar (2004-2005)
 Mattias Nilsson - guitar
 Anders Wenander - bass

External links
 Kayser – official website
 Listenable Records

Swedish thrash metal musical groups
Musical groups established in 2004
Listenable Records artists
Scarlet Records artists